Al-Hayat Media Center is a media wing of the Islamic State. It was established in mid-2014 and targets international (non-Arabic) audiences as opposed to their other Arabic-focused media wings and produces material, mostly Nasheeds, in English, German, Russian, Urdu, Indonesian, Turkish, Bengali, Chinese, Bosnian, Kurdish, Uyghur, and French.

History 

In July 2014, al-Hayat began publishing a digital magazine called Dabiq, in a number of different languages including English. According to the magazine, its name is taken from the town of Dabiq in northern Syria, which is mentioned in a hadith about Armageddon. Al-Hayat also began publishing other digital magazines, including the Turkish language Konstantiniyye, the Ottoman word for Istanbul, and the French language Dar al-Islam. By late 2016, these magazines had apparently all been discontinued, with Al-Hayat's material being consolidated into a new magazine called Rumiyah (Arabic for Rome).

In 2014, al-Hayat published a 24-minute propaganda video in Kurdish, as well as a Kurdish Nasheed called "Descendants of the Caliphate". The video featured Abu Khattab al-Kurdi promising to "bring the Caliphate to Kurdistan and to end the PUK and KDP's atheism".

On 29 June 2014 it released The End of Sykes-Picot, a reference to the 1916 accord that European states used to divide up the region after World War I and in which it calls for destruction of the border between Iraq and Syria. The subject of the video is the ISIL fighter Abu Safiyya.

In February 2015 British journalist John Cantlie appeared in a propaganda video from al-Hayat walking around ruins and interviewing locals in the northwestern Syrian city of Aleppo. On 18 February it released a nasheed in French called Extend your Hand to Pledge Allegiance, which begins with speech by Abu Bakr Al-Baghdadi and it is urged to make the hijra and join ISIS.

In 2015, Al-Hayat released a nasheed song "We are Mujahid" (although the lyric sings "Mujahid" verbatim), sung in Mandarin Chinese, which was the first ever Chinese jihadist materials published by ISIS. It was speculated that the song was targeting Hui people (Chinese-speaking Muslims), as opposed to Uyghurs, who speak Turkic languages.  Chinese mass media and the Chinese government did not talk about it since they did not want to get involved with the battle against ISIS.

In April 2015, Al-Hayat, though affiliated Telegram channels, threatened to blow up Anzac Day dawn memorial services in major cities across Australia and New Zealand, as well as Melbourne Cricket Ground, should Australian Defence Force continues to participate in CJTF-OIR in Iraq. ASIO alleged the Sydney-born jihadist Khaled Sharrouf, who joined ISIS in 2013, was behind this propaganda push.

In September 2015, it released an English nasheed video entitled "For the Sake of Allah", it was shown in its movie-like video "Return of the Gold Dinar", which was a propaganda video showing the Islamic State's new currency and denouncing banknotes and interest. It was explained by Lavdrim Muhaxheri.

In November 2015, it released a Russian nasheed video entitled "Soon very Soon" (Russian: Скоро очень скоро) telling Islamic State supporters to attack Russian churches and government buildings.

In April 2016 it released a video featuring a large group of ISIS child recruits singing in French wearing suicide belts and other weapons during military training. It was titled "Blood for Blood".  Then again in April 2016, they advertised a new monthly series called "Top 10" which takes videos from ISIS' provinces and creates a compilation of those clips.
It made a 52-second trailer for The Flames of War, a video series called Mujatweets and a nashid (Islamic chant) in French named "My revenge" in which it praised the Brussels bombing and both Paris attacks. At the same time it released another video titled Kill Them Wherever You Find Them showing the Paris attackers threatening future violence. Four Belgians, three French nationals, and two Iraqis appeared in the video, carrying out executions alternated with Paris attacks scenes. Those nine terrorist were Abdelhamid Abaaoud (Abu Umar Al-Baljiki), Chakib Akrouh (Abu Mujahid al-Baljiki), Brahim Abdeslam (Abul-Qaqe Al-Baljiki); the kamikazes at Bataclan, Samy Amimour (Abu Qital al-Faransi), Ismaël Omar Mostefaï (Abu Rayyan al-Faransi) and Foued Mohamed-Aggad (Abu Fuad al-Faransi); and the kamikaze at Stade de France, Bilal Hadfi (Dhu-l-Qarnayn al-Faransi) and the Iraqis Ali al-Iraqi and Ukashah Al-Iraqi.

On 20 April 2017, it released a Turkish nasheed video titled "The Islamic State has been established" (Turkish: Kuruldu Islam Devletı) which incited Turkish Muslims to join the Islamic state and attack Turkey to gain more land for the Islamic state.

On 28 July 2017, it released an online video series in English and Arabic entitled "Inside the Caliphate", which focuses on life inside the Islamic State, the first episode dealt with the new currency of the Islamic State and said how it should be used around the globe, the second video dealt with the battle of Raqqa where Australian Islamic State militant under the alias Abu Adam talked about "Victory being near", the third episode talked about the siege of Marawi and the Islamic state soldiers in the conflict, the fourth episode gives a speech from a Singaporean Islamic state militant under the alias Abu 'Uqayl talking about U.S. and British involvement in the Syrian civil war, the episode targets Prince Harry and the British government.  The fifth episode gives a speech from Arabic Islamic State militant under the alias Abul Abbass about the loss of territory and to be patient, and threatens non-Islamic State armies and militants in war.  The sixth episode is a speech from an American Islamic state militant under the alias Abu Salih, Abu Salih talked about the gun laws in America and told supporters of the Islamic state to buy arms and commit mass shootings.  The seventh episode showed the Syrian civil war and suicide bombers in VBIEDs attacking Syrian soldiers, it also featured an unknown Islamic state woman fighting with a Kalashnikov.  The eighth and last episode revolves around the Islamic state's mass propaganda, and American production companies, and told Islamic state supporters to create accounts and post Islamic state videos on platforms like Facebook and Twitter.

On 31 December 2017 it spread via Telegram O' Disbelievers of the World which shows an apocalyptic view of the war between ISIS and the unbelief. The video shows Donald Trump, Bashar al-Assad, Abdullah of Saudi Arabia, Putin, Netanyahu and Emmanuel Macron. It features an opening monologue from spokesman Abu Muhammad al-Adnani, and the song is sung by Jean-Michel Clain.

On 26 January 2018 it released a nasheed called Answer the Call where supporters were urged to carry out gruesome terror attacks in Western countries.

On 21 March 2019, the U.S. Department of State officially deemed al-Hayat an alias of ISIL, and thus a Foreign Terrorist Organization.

On 26 July 2020, it released a video entitled "Incite the Believers" which shown ideas of terrorist attacks to lone wolf terrorists in western countries.  In the video, they rated arson as a "5-star" terrorist attack, citing the California wild fires.

On 10 October 2020 it released a nasheed titled "Coldly Kill Them". Later Islamic State released a video for the nasheed.

See also
Al-Bayan (radio station)
Dabiq (magazine)

References

 
2014 establishments in Syria
Jihadist propaganda
Apocalyptic literature
Pashto-language mass media